"Kids in America" is a song recorded by English pop singer Kim Wilde. It was released in the United Kingdom as her debut single in January 1981, and in the United States in spring 1982, later appearing on her self-titled debut studio album. Largely inspired by the synth-pop style of Orchestral Manoeuvres in the Dark (OMD) and Gary Numan, the song reached number two on the UK Singles Chart for two weeks and number one in Finland and South Africa, and charted in the top 10 of many European charts as well as Australia and New Zealand. In North America, the song reached the top 40 in Canada and the United States. It was certified gold in the United Kingdom, South Africa, Australia and Sweden; and has sold over three million copies worldwide. The song has been covered by many artists from different genres.

Background, composition and production

1980 version
RAK Records boss Mickie Most heard Wilde singing on a backing track to another song recorded by her brother Ricky Wilde, an aspiring young songwriter and producer who had some fame as a child singer in the style of Donny Osmond in the early 1970s.

Most liked Kim's voice and looks and expressed an interest in working with her. Eager to grab the opportunity, Ricky went home and wrote "Kids in America" that same day with his father Marty. Marty Wilde, also a former singer, had been a teen idol and actor in the UK in the late 1950s and early 1960s.

They wrote the song using a WASP synthesizer owned by Ricky. He has said that its main synth line was influenced by that of Orchestral Manoeuvres in the Dark's "Messages". Kim has stated that her brother "kind of nicked" the line. The eighth note synth bassline, which forms the intro, was inspired by Gary Numan (as was the vocal melody in the opening lines).

They went into the studio with everything except the words to the chorus, which Marty Wilde, who was responsible for writing the lyrics to the song, came up with at the last minute. The line "Whoah-oh!", which is sung after the song's title lyrics, was originally meant to be a guitar lick or a brass stab, but sounded much better sung by the male backing vocals, according to Marty.

After hearing the track for the first time, Most declared it would be a smash hit; but it needed remixing, which he did together with Marty at RAK Studios. The song was shelved for a year before being released as Kim Wilde's first single in January 1981.

1994 version
"Kids in America 1994" was released in May 1994 in order to help promote Wilde's compilation album The Remix Collection (1993). Although it was intended to be released in the UK, for unknown reasons these plans were cancelled at the last minute. However, the track was released in other countries in several remixed forms using Wilde's original vocals from 1981.

2006 version
Among some of her other classic hits, Wilde recorded a new version of the song for her 2006 comeback album Never Say Never, featuring English singer Charlotte Hatherley. This version, like the rest of the album, was produced by German producer Uwe Fahrenkrog-Petersen, with whom she had previously worked in 2002 for German singer Nena's 20th anniversary album Nena feat. Nena on the track "Anyplace, Anywhere, Anytime", a new version of her 1984 hit single.

Reception
"Kids in America" signalled the start of Wilde's career. It sold so well in its first week, foul play was suspected and it was not included in that week's chart. In its first eight weeks of release, the single sold more than half a million copies in the UK alone. The song peaked at number two in the UK in 1981 and became the 23rd best-selling single that year. The following year in 1982, it reached No. 25 on the US Billboard Hot 100 for over a month and ranked as the 91st most successful song of 1982 on the Hot 100 year-end chart. Though it only hit No. 25, it received heavy airplay on radio stations and MTV. Elsewhere, the record peaked atop the charts of Finland and South Africa. In Europe and Australia, the song was also a major top 10 hit. After "Kids in America", Wilde's father and brother continued to write songs for her (with the latter also given production credits). In later years, she chiefly co-wrote with her brother.

Track listing
7" UK single
"Kids in America" – 3:26
"Tuning in Tuning On" – 4:30

7" US/Canada single
"Kids in America" – 3:26
"You'll Never Be So Wrong" – 4:11

Charts

Weekly charts

Year-end charts

Notable cover versions
 The Muffs contributed a cover of the song to the soundtrack for the 1995 film Clueless. This cover was itself used in the 2008 rhythm game Rock Band 2.
 Len contributed a cover of the song to the soundtrack for the 2000 film Digimon: The Movie.
 The song was used in the King of the Hill Season 13 Episode "No Bobby Left Behind".
 No Secrets covered the song in 2001 for the soundtrack of Jimmy Neutron: Boy Genius.
 Tiffany recorded a version of the song in 2007 for her album I Think We're Alone Now: '80s Hits and More. 
 Cascada recorded a version of the song on their Everytime We Touch album in 2007. 
 Foo Fighters covered the song in their EP Songs from the Laundry Room (2015). A clip of it plays during the credit roll of the Seattle, Washington episode of Grohl's Sonic Highways documentary TV series. In 2021, Wilde admitted to being a huge fan of the recording and said she'd love to collaborate with frontman Dave Grohl on a new version of the track.
 Billie Joe Armstrong of Green Day did a cover of the song on his cover album No Fun Mondays (2020) with the same title.
 Toy Dolls released the parody 'The Kids in Tyne and Wear' on the album Fat Bob's Feet in 1991.

References

External links
 

1980 songs
1981 debut singles
1994 singles
Kim Wilde songs
No Secrets (musical group) songs
Foo Fighters songs
Len (band) songs
Number-one singles in Finland
Number-one singles in South Africa
RAK Records singles
Songs about the United States
Songs written by Marty Wilde
Songs written by Ricky Wilde
British power pop songs